Glas Bheinn (792 m) is a mountain in the Grampian Mountains of Scotland, northeast of the village of Kinlochleven in Lochaber.

A remote wedge-shaped peak, it rises from the shore of Loch Eilde Mor opposite the high Mamores mountain range. Climbs usually start from Kinlochleven.

References 

Mountains and hills of Highland (council area)
Marilyns of Scotland
Corbetts